100 Avenue is a major arterial road in west Edmonton, Alberta, Canada.

The road starts as Stony Plain Road (Alberta Highway 16A), and as it approaches Anthony Henday Drive it separates into westbound and eastbound one-way streets. The westbound lanes occupy the 101 Avenue alignment, keeping the name Stony Plain Road, while the eastbound street becomes 100 Avenue. 100 Avenue passes through a commercial area, through the major intersection of 170 Street and Mayfield Road, before becoming its own two-way street at 163 Street; it is also known as John and Zita Rosen Way between 178 Street and 170 Street. It passes by MacEwan University Centre for the Arts Campus before arterial 149 Street, which can be used to get back on Stony Plain Road if one were on the way to downtown.

Neighbourhoods
List of neighbourhoods 100 Avenue runs through, in order from west to east:
Stewart Greens
La Perle
Place LaRue
Terra Losa
Britannia Youngstown
Glenwood
West Jasper Place
Canora
Crestwood

Major intersections
This is a list of major intersections, starting at the west end of 100 Avenue.

Other segments
100 Avenue is an important street in Downtown Edmonton, beginning at 102 Street near Edmonton House.  It continues westward and eventually merges into Jasper Avenue at 121 Street.

Segments of 100 Avenue also exist in Terrace Heights.

See also 

 List of avenues in Edmonton
 Transportation in Edmonton

References

Roads in Edmonton
Former segments of the Trans-Canada Highway